Makhlai is a Russian surname. Notable persons with that surname include:

 Sergei Makhlai (born  1968), Russian businessman
 Vladimir Makhlai (born 1937), Russian engineer, economist and entrepreneur

Surnames of Russian origin